Denis Krivushkin (born 1978) is a Kazakhstani cross-country skier. He competed at the Winter Olympics in 2002 in Salt Lake City, and in Turin in 2006.

References

1978 births
Living people
Cross-country skiers at the 2002 Winter Olympics
Cross-country skiers at the 2006 Winter Olympics
Kazakhstani male cross-country skiers
Olympic cross-country skiers of Kazakhstan
Cross-country skiers at the 2003 Asian Winter Games
21st-century Kazakhstani people